Anna Rebecca Slotky Reitano (née Slotky; born June 30, 1981) is an American attorney and former actress. She is perhaps best known for her role as Ruth Ann in the television sitcom The Torkelsons.

She had a recurring role as Denise on Sister, Sister, and guest starred on 3rd Rock from the Sun, Doctor Doctor and Step by Step. She also played Brooke, one of the McCallister children, in Home Alone (1990) and its 1992 sequel Home Alone 2: Lost in New York. Her last acting credit was a guest appearance on the Fox series Get Real in 2000.

Slotky completed her undergraduate studies at Occidental College in Los Angeles, California and earned her Juris Doctor degree at the University of California, Davis School of Law (King Hall) in May 2008. She was admitted to the State Bar of California in 2009, and is currently working as a public defender for Los Angeles County. She is a leading candidate for Judge of Los Angeles County having made it into the runoff election in November 2022.

Personal life
Slotky married animator James Reitano on April 30, 2011, and gave birth to a son on February 14, 2012.

Filmography

References

External links

20th-century American actresses
21st-century American actresses
Actresses from Illinois
American child actresses
American film actresses
Lawyers from Los Angeles
American television actresses
Living people
Occidental College alumni
People from Buffalo Grove, Illinois
UC Davis School of Law alumni
1981 births
American women lawyers
Public defenders